FC Telavi is a Georgian association football club from the city of Telavi, competing in Erovnuli Liga, the first tier of Georgian league system.

They have been a member of the top flight since 2020.

History 
The football club was founded in 2016 by former football players Irakli Vashakidze, Soso Grishikashvili and Aleksandre Amisulashvili.
Telavi successfully completed their first season in Regionuli Liga in 2016 and earned a place in III division. The next year they finished 2nd in Group White and in promotion play-offs defeated Guria 3-2 on aggregate.

In 2018, Telavi took a foothold in Liga 2 coming 5th in the final table. On David Kipiani Cup Telavi eliminated four opponents, including Dila Gori, and reached the semifinals where they lost to Torpedo Kutaisi, future champions of the competition.

The next year they booked another promotion play-off, beat Rustavi in both games and advanced to Erovnuli Liga. With this result the team achieved three promotions within the four seasons. Also, after a twelve-year pause the first-tier football finally returned to the capital of Kakheti.

Following this promotion nine new players, including four foreigners, strengthened the squad for 2020. During their very first season the club was widely praised for decent performance. Having lost just two games out of 18, FC Telavi finished in the 6th place.

The next season began poorly. After being winless for 17 games Telavi seemed a primary candidate for relegation, which resulted in the exit of manager. Starting from mid-June the team experienced some revival, producing an unbeaten run for seven matches, including five wins. They secured six more victories in the last quarter of the season, leapfrogged the rivals and accomplished a great escape. With this achievement Giorgi Mikadze claimed Manager of Erovnuli Liga Round 4 (October-December) award.

Seasons 
{|class="wikitable"
|-bgcolor="#efefef"
! Year
! Division
! Pos
! P
! W
! D
! L
! GF
! GA
! Pts
! Cup
! Manager
|-
|rowspan='2'|2017
|3rd, White Group
|bgcolor=Silver|2/10
|align=right|18 ||align=right|10 ||align=right|5 ||align=right|3
|align=right|30 ||align=right|18 ||align=right|35
|rowspan='2' |3rd Round
|rowspan='2' |Giorgi Dekanosidze 
|-
|Promotion Group
|bgcolor=#F1A33F|3/10
|align=right|18 ||align=right|12 ||align=right|3 ||align=right|3
|align=right|56 ||align=right|15 ||align=right|39
|-
|2018
|rowspan="2"|
|align=right|5/10
|align=right|36 ||align=right|12 ||align=right|12 ||align=right|12
|align=right|45 ||align=right|43 ||align=right|48
| finals
|Denis Khomutov
|-
|2019
|bgcolor=#F1A33F|3/10
|align=right|36 ||align=right|19 ||align=right|6 ||align=right|11
|align=right|70 ||align=right|36 ||align=right|63
| finals
|rowspan="2"|Revaz Gotsiridze
|-
|2020
|rowspan="3"|
|align=right|6/10
|align=right|18 ||align=right|4 ||align=right|12 ||align=right|2
|align=right|21 ||align=right|14 ||align=right|24
| finals
|-
|2021
|align=right|6/10
|align=right|36 ||align=right|12 ||align=right|8 ||align=right|16
|align=right|35 ||align=right|53 ||align=right|44
| finals
|Revaz Gotsiridze; Giorgi Mikadze
|-
|2022
|align=right|7/10
|align=right|36 ||align=right|8 ||align=right|15 ||align=right|13
|align=right|29 ||align=right|36 ||align=right|39 
| finals
| Giorgi Chelidze;  Giorgi Tsetsadze
|}

Current squad 
As of 28 February 2023

Stadium
Givi Chokheli football ground is home to FC Telavi, although the club played most of their home games in the last two seasons on Kavkasioni Rugby Arena.  

In October 2020, local authorities made a presentation on construction plans for a brand new stadium.

Sponsors
In early 2018, FC Telavi signed a sponsorship contract with m2 Development company.

External links
 Profile on Soccerway
 Page on Facebook

References

 
Football clubs in Georgia (country)
Association football clubs established in 2016
2016 establishments in Georgia (country)